Maria Lucia Ratna Sulistya (born 14 January 1975), also known as Maria Lucia Ratna or Maria Lucia Sulistya, is an Indonesian chess player. She received the FIDE title of Woman International Master (WIM) in 1993 and is a two-time Indonesian Women's Chess Championship winner (1993, 1995).

Biography
In 1992, in Buenos Aires, Sulistya won the bronze medal at the World Girl's Junior Championship in U20 age group. She twice won Indonesian Women's Chess Championship: in 1993 and 1995. In 1993, Sulistya participated in Women's World Chess Championship Interzonal Tournament in Jakarta where she ranked 29th place. She represented Indonesia at the Women's Asian Team Chess Championship in 1995. In 1998, in Kuala Lumpur she shared 10th place in the Asian Women's Chess Championship.

Sulistya played for Indonesia in the Women's Chess Olympiads:
 In 1990, at third board in the 29th Chess Olympiad (women) in Novi Sad (+6, =3, -4),
 In 1992, at third board in the 30th Chess Olympiad (women) in Manila (+6, =5, -3),
 In 1994, at third board in the 31st Chess Olympiad (women) in Moscow (+5, =3, -4),
 In 1996, at first board in the 32nd Chess Olympiad (women) in Yerevan (+5, =6, -2).

References

External links
 
 
 
 

1975 births
Living people
Indonesian female chess players
Chess Woman International Masters
Chess Olympiad competitors
20th-century Indonesian women
21st-century Indonesian women